Rafael Gustavo Meneghel Gava (born 20 May 1993), known as Rafael Gava, is a Brazilian footballer who plays as a midfielder for Cuiabá.

Club career
On 24 June 2019, Gava signed a 3-year contract with Primeira Liga club Paços de Ferreira. The following 28 January, he was loaned back to his home country with Cuiabá.

On 24 October 2020, Gava signed a permanent deal with Cuiabá until April 2022. The following 1 March, after helping the Dourado in their first-ever promotion to the Série A, he renewed his contract until December 2023.

Career statistics

Honours
Cuiabá
Campeonato Mato-Grossense: 2021, 2022

References

External links

1993 births
Living people
Brazilian footballers
Association football midfielders
Campeonato Brasileiro Série A players
Campeonato Brasileiro Série B players
Campeonato Brasileiro Série C players
Campeonato Brasileiro Série D players
Primeira Liga players
Sport Club Internacional players
Agremiação Sportiva Arapiraquense players
Clube Esportivo Lajeadense players
Londrina Esporte Clube players
Sociedade Esportiva e Recreativa Caxias do Sul players
Grêmio Esportivo Brasil players
F.C. Paços de Ferreira players
Cuiabá Esporte Clube players
Brazilian expatriate footballers
Brazilian expatriate sportspeople in Portugal
Expatriate footballers in Portugal